The Pakistani rupee ( / ALA-LC: ; sign: Re (singular) and Rs (plural); ISO code: PKR) is the official currency of Pakistan since 1948. The coins and notes are issued and controlled by the central bank, namely State Bank of Pakistan.

In Pakistani English, large values of rupees are counted in thousands; lakh (hundred thousands); crore (ten-millions); arab (billion); kharab (hundred billion). Numbers are still grouped in thousands (123,456,789 rather than 12,34,56,789 as written in India)

History

The word rūpiya is derived from the Sanskrit word rūpya, which means "wrought silver, a coin of silver", in origin an adjective meaning "shapely", with a more specific meaning of "stamped, impressed", whence "coin". It is` derived from the noun  rūpa "shape, likeness, image". Rūpaya was used to denote the coin introduced by Sher Shah Suri during his reign from 1540 to 1545 CE.

The Pakistani rupee was put into circulation in Pakistan after the dissolution of the British Raj in 1947. Initially, Pakistan used British Indian coins and notes simply over-stamped with "Pakistan". New coins and banknotes were issued in 1948. Like the Indian rupee, it was originally divided into 16 annas, each of 4 pice or 12 pie. The currency was decimalised on 1 January 1961, with the rupee subdivided into 100 pice, renamed (in English) paise (singular paisa) later the same year. However, coins denominated in paise have not been issued since 1994.

Coins 

In 1948, coins were introduced in denominations of 1 pice, 1 and 2 annas,  and 1 rupee. 1 pie coins were added in 1951. In 1961, coins for 1, 5 and 10 pice were issued, followed later the same year by 1 paisa, 5 and 10 paise coins. In 1963, 10 and 25 paise coins were introduced, followed by 2 paise the next year. Re. 1/- coins were reintroduced in 1979, followed by Rs. 2/- in 1998 and Rs. 5/- in 2002. 2 paise coins were last minted in 1976, with 1 paisa coins ceasing production in 1979. The 5, 10, 25 and 50 paise all ceased production in 1996. There are two variations of Rs. 2/- coins: most have clouds above the Badshahi Masjid but many do not. The Re. 1/- and Rs. 2/- coins were changed to aluminium in 2007.

Paisa denominated coins ceased to be legal tender in 2013, leaving the Re. 1/- coin as the minimum legal tender. On 15 October 2015, the Pakistan government introduced a revised Rs. 5/- coin with a reduced size and weight and having a golden colour, made from a composition of copper-nickel-zinc, and also in 2016 a Rs. 10/- coin was introduced into circulation.

In 2019 the Pakistan government introduced a commemorative Rs. 50/- coin to celebrate the 550th birthday of Sri Gru Nanak Dev Ji and in tribute of opening of new Gurdwara of Kartarpur Pakistan.

Banknotes
On 1 April 1948, provisional notes were issued by the Reserve Bank of India and the Government of India on behalf of the Government of Pakistan, for use exclusively within Pakistan, without the possibility of redemption in India. Printed by the India Security Press in Nasik, these notes consist of Indian note plates engraved (not overprinted) with the words GOVERNMENT OF PAKISTAN in English and "Hukumat-e-PAKISTAN" in Urdu added at the top and bottom, respectively, of the watermark area on the front only; the signatures on these notes remain those of Indian banking and finance officials.

Regular government issues commenced in 1948 in denominations of Re. 1/-, Rs. 5/-, Rs. 10/- and Rs. 100/-. The government continued to issue Re. 1 notes until the 1980s but another note-issuing was taken over by the State Bank of Pakistan in 1953 when Rs. 2/-, Rs. 5/-, Rs. 10/- and Rs. 100/- notes were issued. Only a few Rs. 2/- notes were issued. Rs. 50/- notes were added in 1957, with Rs. 2/- notes reintroduced in 1985. In 1986, Rs. 500/- notes were introduced, followed by Rs. 1,000/- the next year. Rs. 2/- and Rs. 5/- notes were replaced by coins in 1998 and 2002. Rs. 20/- notes were added in 2005, followed by Rs. 5,000/- in 2006. Until 1971, Pakistan banknotes were bilingual, featuring Bengali translation of the Urdu text (where the currency was renamed taka), since Bengali was the state language of East Pakistan (now Bangladesh).

All banknotes other than the Re. 1/- and Rs. 2/- feature a portrait of Muhammad Ali Jinnah on the obverse along with writing in Urdu. The reverses of the banknotes vary in design and have English text.

The banknotes vary in size and colour, with larger denominations being longer than smaller ones. All contain multiple colours. However, each denomination does have one colour which predominates. All banknotes feature a watermark for security purposes. On the larger denomination notes, the watermark is a picture of Jinnah, while on smaller notes, it is a crescent and star. Different types of security threads are also present in each banknote.

The State Bank has started a new series of banknotes, phasing out the older designs for new, more secure ones.

Hajj and special anniversary banknotes 
Pakistan put foreign exchange controls in place in 1949, restricting the export and import of currency except for when needed for the Hajj in Saudi Arabia. This created an opportunity for smuggling, leading Pakistan to issue special Hajj notes for use by pilgrims. These were differentiated by an overprint in English "For pilgrims from Pakistan for use in Saudi Arabia and Iraq".

Although other means of exchange were considered, the high level of illiteracy amongst the Pakistani pilgrims and the additional costs that would be incurred through the need to purchase such means prevented the government from these methods of exchange. The State Bank Order to allow the issue of these "Hajj notes" was made in May 1950.

A new series of notes was released in 1972, under the name of the State Bank of Pakistan rather than the Government of Pakistan. These had an urdu overprint as well as an English one, saying "For Haj [sic] pilgrims from Pakistan for use in Saudi Arabia only". New notes were printed in 1975 and 1978, reflecting changes in the standard notes. The use of Hajj notes continued until 1978. Until this date, stocks of notes were used without the necessity of printing new notes with the signatures of the later Governors. It is believed that, once the use of Hajj Notes was discontinued, most of the remaining stock of notes were destroyed. However, many notes entered the collector market following their sale to a banknote dealer by the State Bank of Pakistan.

Exchange rate 

Since the United States dollar suspension in 1971 of convertibility of paper currency into any precious metal, the Pakistani rupee has been fiat money. Before the collapse of Bretton Woods system, currency was pegged at fixed exchange rate to the United States dollar for international trade, with the dollar convertible to gold for foreign governments only.

The rupee was pegged to sterling until 1982 when the government of General Zia-ul-Haq changed to a managed float. As a result, the rupee devalued by 38.5% between 1982–83 and 1987–88 and the cost of importing raw materials increased rapidly, causing pressure on Pakistani finances and damaging much of the industrial base. The Pakistani rupee depreciated against the United States dollar until the turn of the century, when Pakistan's large current account surplus pushed the value of the rupee up against the dollar. The State Bank of Pakistan then stabilized the exchange rate by lowering interest rates and buying dollars, in order to preserve the country's export competitiveness.

2008 was termed a disastrous year for the rupee after the elections: between December 2007 and August 2008 it lost 23% of its value, falling to a record low of Rs.79/20 against the US dollar. The major reasons for this depreciation were huge current and trade accounts deficits that had built up since the credit boom in Pakistan after 2002. Due to rising militancy in the NWFP and FATA areas, foreign direct investment began to fall, and the structural problems of the balance of payment were exposed; foreign exchange reserves fell disastrously to as low as US$2 billion. However, by February 2011 Forex reserves had recovered and set a new record of $17 billion. Of that US$17 billion, more than US$10 billion was borrowed money on which interest was payable.

In February 2016 the rupee was Rs. 104/66 against US dollar. In December 2017, after holding talks with the IMF, Pakistan agreed to depreciate the rupee and the State Bank of Pakistan (SBP) would now let the currency exchange rate adjust to market conditions after many months, or years, of resisting expectations. The Pakistani rupee touched a new low of Rs. 110/67 against the US dollar, and on 18 July it touched another record new low of Rs. 128/26 against the dollar. It hit another low of Rs. 161/50 against the dollar on 26 June 2019..

On 17 March 2022, rupee lost Re. -/63 or 0.35 per cent against the dollar to settle at Rs. 180/07, as per data published by the State Bank of Pakistan (SBP), .

As of 7 April 2022 the Pakistani rupee now stands at Rs. 186/13.
As of 18 May 2022 the Pakistani rupee now stands at Rs. 195/65. As of 30 June 2022 Pakistan Rupee stands at Rs. 204/01.
As of 20 August 2022 the Pakistani rupee now stands at Rs. 214/50 to the dollar.  As of 03 February 2023 the Pakistani rupee now stands at Rs. 273/33 to the dollar.Pakistani rupee now stands at Rs.282

See also 
 Currency
 Rupee
 History of the rupee
 Economy of Pakistan
 List of countries by leading trade partners

Notes

External links 
  AA EXCHANGE is SBP's Authorized agent for PAK RUPEE conversion into foreign currency
 SBP's webpage on the newnotes
 Business Recorder: Pakistan's first financial newspaper
 State Bank to issue Rs.5000/- and New Rs.10/- Banknotes from 27 May 2006: Governor
 Current Gold Rate In Pakistan

Rupee, Pakistani
Currencies of the Commonwealth of Nations
Currencies of Pakistan
Currencies of Asia
Currencies introduced in 1948
Circulating currencies
Currencies of the British Empire